Tavla Gençlikspor is a women's football club located in the Defne district of Hatay Province, southern Turkey. The team was promoted to the Turkish Women's Second Football League for the 2020–21 season.

Statistics

Notes:
1) Three penalty points were deducted by the Turkish Football Federation
2) Promoted to the Women's Second League by point average after the discontinued season due to the outbreak of the COVID-19 pandemic in Turkey

References

External links 
Tavla Gençlikspor on TFF.org

Football clubs in Hatay
Women's football clubs in Turkey
Defne District